Siles may refer to:

People:

Jemma Siles (b. 1997), Australian singer/songwriter
Hernando Siles Reyes (b. 1882), 31st President of Bolivia, 27th Vice President of Bolivia
Hernán Siles Zuazo (b. 1914), 46th President of Bolivia, 31st Vice President of Bolivia
Luis Adolfo Siles Salinas (b. 1925), 49th President of Bolivia
Gome de Siles, Spanish noble and knight during the reign of Charles V, Holy Roman Emperor

Places:

Estadio Hernando Siles, a sports stadium in La Paz, Bolivia
Hernando Siles Province, in the Chuquisaca Department, Bolivia
Puerto Siles, a town and municipality in Yacuma Province in the Beni Department of northern Bolivia
Siles, Jaén, a town in Andalusia, Spain